Keppel may refer to:

People
 Alice Keppel (1869–1947), English society figure, Edward VII's last mistress, and great grandmother to Camilla, Duchess of Cornwall
 Arnold van Keppel, 1st Earl of Albemarle (1670–1718), the right-hand man of William of Orange
 Augustus Keppel, 1st Viscount Keppel (1725–1786), British admiral
 Colin Richard Keppel (1862–1947), Henry Keppel's son, British admiral
 Cynthia Keppel, American nuclear physicist
 Edwin Keppel Bennett (1887–1958), British academic
 Francis Keppel (1916–1990), American educator
 George Keppel, 3rd Earl of Albemarle (1724–1772), British general
 George Keppel (1865–1947), British Army officer, husband of Alice Keppel
 Henry Keppel (1809–1904), British admiral
 Judith Keppel (b. 1942), British, first million-pound winner on Who Wants to Be a Millionaire?
 Keppel "Kep" Enderby (1926–2015), Australian politician, cabinet minister, lawyer and judge
 Robert D. Keppel, American detective and criminal profiler known for his work with Ted Bundy
 Valentine S. Keppel (1865–1940), American politician
 Willem van Keppel, 2nd Earl of Albemarle (1702–1754), British soldier, diplomat and courtier
 William Keppel, 4th Earl of Albemarle (1772–1849), British aristocrat
 William Coutts Keppel (1832–1894), British soldier

Places
 Hummelo en Keppel, a former municipality in the Netherlands
 Various places in Singapore named after Henry Keppel, including:
  Keppel Bay Towers and the associated roads Keppel Bay Drive, Keppel Bay View and Keppel Bay Vista; Keppel Harbour, Keppel Hill and Keppel Road
 Keppel Island in the Falkland Islands
 Great Keppel Island in Australia
 Electoral district of Keppel in Queensland, Australia
 Keppel Island, a former name for the Tongan island of Niuatoputapu
 Keppel Street, London

Others
 Keppel Union School District, a school district serving eastern Palmdale, California and its suburbs
 Keppel Corporation, a Singaporean company
 Wilson, Keppel and Betty, a British music hall act
 MV Keppel, a Scottish ferry
 A shade of cyan